Milos is a Greek island.

Milos may also refer to:
 Miloš (also Milos and Milosz), a masculine given name and a surname
 Milos Milos (1941–1966), Serbian-born American actor, stunt double and bodyguard
 Milos (regional unit), a Greek regional unit
 BOV M16 Miloš, a Serbian combat vehicle
 Miloš (unmanned ground vehicle), an unmanned ground vehicle developed by the Military Technical Institute Belgrade
 , one of three ships chartered in 1940 to take Jewish refugees from Romania to Palestine—see Patria disaster

Milo's or Milo s may refer to:
 Milo's Astro Lanes, a 1998 bowling game for the Nintendo 64 home video game console
 Milo's Hamburgers, a regional restaurant chain based in Alabama, United States
 Southern Military District (Milo S), a former command of the Swedish Armed Forces

See also
 Milosz Point, South Shetland Islands, Antarctica